Brian Henderson (born 1948) is a Canadian writer, poet, and photographer, whose book of poetry Nerve Language was shortlisted for the Governor General's Award for Poetry in 2007.

Biography
Henderson, born in 1948 in Kitchener, Ontario, has a PhD in Canadian Literature from York University. Henderson has worked as a university instructor, a phone jack installer, a traffic counter, a shipper/receiver, and a rock drummer.

He is the author of thirteen collections of poetry including The Alphamiricon, a deck of visual poem-cards. His work has been published in many small magazines. In the 1970s Henderson was a founding editor of RUNE.

He was the director of Wilfrid Laurier University Press from 2005-2016.

Literary activities
His poetry and literary criticism has appeared in Arc Poetry Magazine, Antigonish Review, Canadian Forum, Canadian Literature, CVII, Descant, ECW, The Fiddlehead, Prism, Quarry, Rampike, RUNE (of which he was a founding editor for its decade of existence), Scrivener, Writ and many other literary journals since 1974.

Awards

Nominations 

 Governor General's Award for Poetry, 2007, finalist (for Nerve Language)
 Canadian Author’s Association Award for Poetry, 2012, finalist (for Sharawadji)
 Raymond Souster Award, 2020, longlisted

Published works
Books:
Unfinishing, McGill-Queen's University Press, 2022
Unidentified Poetic Object, Brick Books, 2019
[OR], Talonbooks, 2014 
Sharawadji, Brick Books, 2011
Nerve Language, Pedlar Press, 2007
Light in Dark Objects, Ekstasis Editions, 2000
Year Zero, Brick Books, 1995
Smoking Mirror, ECW Press, 1990
The Alphamiricon, Underwhich Editions, 1987; available on Ubu.com/visual poetry
Migration of Light, General Publishing, 1983
The Veridical Book of the Silent Planet, Aya Press, 1978
Paracelsus, Porcupine's Quill, 1977
The Expanding Room, Black Moss Press, 1977

Anthologies:
W.H. New, ed., Inside the Poem, Oxford University Press, 1992
Robert Allen, ed., The Lyric Paragraph, D.C. Books, 1987
Leslie Nutting, ed., The Toronto Collection, Manoeuvers Press, 1984
Ken Norris, Twenty Canadian Poets of the Eighties, Anansi, 1984

External links
Official website
Author page at Brick Books

References

1948 births
Living people
20th-century Canadian poets
20th-century Canadian male writers
Canadian male poets
Canadian photographers
York University alumni
21st-century Canadian poets
Writers from Kitchener, Ontario
21st-century Canadian male writers